Yuk-Yi Yung (born 1918) is a Chinese-born former actress based in Hong Kong. Yung is credited with over 310 films.

Early life 
In 1918, Yung was born in Shanghai, China. Yung's sister was Siu-Yi Yung.

Career 
Yung and her sister joined Plum Blossom Song and Dance Troupe. In 1938, Yung became an actress with Nanyang Film Company in Hong Kong. Yung first appeared as Kam Ching in The Purple Cups, a 1938 film directed by Hou Yao. Yung appeared in Martial Arts films such as The Adventures of Fang Shiyu (Part 2) (1939), Swordswoman Red Butterfly (1939), The White Lotus Menace (1939), The Eunuch (1971), and Tornado of Pearl River (1974). Yung also appeared in drama films and comedy films. Yung rarely appeared in films with her sister Siu-Yi Yung except for Sima Fu's Encounter with the Honey Gang, a 1949 thriller film directed by Hung Suk-Wan, and The Beau, a 1964 film directed by Chun Kim. Yung's last film was Carry on Con Men, a 1975 comedy film directed by Wong Fung. Yung is credited with over 310 films.

Filmography

Films 
This is a partial list of films.
 1938 The Purple Cups - Kam Ching
 1939 The Adventures of Fang Shiyu (Part 2) 
 1939 Swordswoman Red Butterfly 
 1939 The White Lotus Menace 
 1941 Chaos in the Universe
 1942 The Rich House - Sally 
 1947 The Distressed Lover
 1948 Woman's Heart - Ho So-Hing
 1949 Sima Fu's Encounter with the Honey Gang
 1960 Ten Schoolgirls - Second Mrs Lee.
 1962 The Quick-witted Woman Detective (aka A Detective's Affair) - Ah Sam 
 1964 The Beau
 1965 The Six-fingered Lord of the Lute (Part 1) 
 1967 The Brave Girl 
 1967 Broadcast Queen 
 1967 Family Man 
 1967 First Love - Mrs. Wong.
 1967 The Great Lover 
 1967 Prodigal in Distress 
 1970 The Heart-Stealer - Mother Tien.
 1970 	The Young Girl Dares Not Homeward (aka Girl Wanders Around) - Jo Lei's mother.
 1970 Yesterday, Today, Tomorrow 
 1971 The Eunuch 
 1974 Tornado of Pearl River - Brothel madam 
 1975 Carry on Con Men - Zhang Yunan's mother-in-law

References

External links 
 Yung Yuk Yi at hkcinemagic.com
 Yung Yuk-yi at senscritique.com

1918 births
Possibly living people
Chinese emigrants to British Hong Kong
Hong Kong film actresses